Jules Tavernier may refer to:
Jules Tavernier (painter) (1844–1889), French painter
Jules Tavernier (EastEnders), fictional character